Alla mia età may refer to:

 Alla mia età (album), a 2008 album by Tiziano Ferro
 "Alla mia età" (song), a song from the album